Henrique Selicani Teixeira (born 27 February 1989) is a Brazilian handball player for CSM București and the Brazil national team.

He won a gold medal the 2015 Pan American Games and competed at the 2015 World Championships and 2016 Summer Olympics.

Titles
Pan American Men's Club Handball Championship:
''2014, 2015

Achievements
2018 Pan American Men's Handball Championship: Best player

References

External links

1989 births
Living people
Brazilian male handball players
Brazilian expatriate sportspeople in Spain
Brazilian expatriate sportspeople in Romania
Expatriate handball players
Liga ASOBAL players
Pan American Games gold medalists for Brazil
Pan American Games silver medalists for Brazil
Pan American Games bronze medalists for Brazil
Handball players at the 2011 Pan American Games
Handball players at the 2015 Pan American Games
Handball players at the 2019 Pan American Games
Handball players at the 2016 Summer Olympics
Olympic handball players of Brazil
People from Maringá
BM Granollers players
Pan American Games medalists in handball
South American Games gold medalists for Brazil
South American Games medalists in handball
Competitors at the 2018 South American Games
Medalists at the 2015 Pan American Games
Medalists at the 2019 Pan American Games
Medalists at the 2011 Pan American Games
Handball players at the 2020 Summer Olympics
Sportspeople from Paraná (state)
21st-century Brazilian people